National road 5 is a route belonging to the Polish national road network. The highway connects some of the biggest urban agglomerations in Poland, i.e. Trójmiasto, Bydgoszcz, Poznań and Wrocław. It runs from Nowe Marzy to Lubawka at the Czech border and between Bielany Wrocławskie and Kostomłoty merges with A4 motorway. On the segment from Nowe Marzy to Wrocław, it is a component of European route E261.

Major cities and towns along the route 
 Nowe Marzy (road A1, 91)
 Świecie (road 91)
 Bydgoszcz (road 10, 25, 80)
 Szubin
 Żnin
 Gniezno (road 15)
 Pobiedziska
 Poznań (road A2, 11, 92)
 Stęszew (road 32)
 Kościan
 Śmigiel
 Leszno (road 12)
 Rydzyna
 Bojanowo
 Rawicz (road 36)
 Żmigród
 Trzebnica (road 15)
 Wrocław (road A8, 94, 98)
 Bielany Wrocławskie (road A4, 98)
 Kąty Wrocławskie
 Strzegom
 Bolków (road 3)
 Kamienna Góra
 Lubawka, border with Czech Republic

05